Young Latvia may refer to:

Young Latvia movement, Latvia, 19th century
Jaunlatvija, political party, Latvia, 21st century
Jaunā Latvija, an extreme right party, Latvia, 1933-1934